Sol Polansky (November 7, 1926 – January 6, 2016) was an American diplomat.

Born in Newark, Polansky received his bachelor's degree from University of California in 1950. He then went to Columbia University and attended the Russian Institute from 1950 to 1952. In 1972 Polansky went to the National War College in Washington, D. C. Polansky joined the United States Foreign Service in 1962; he was stationed in the Soviet Union, Poland and West Berlin. He was also stationed in East Germany from 1976 to 1979 and in Austria. From 1987 until 1990, Polansky was the United States Ambassador to Bulgaria.

Notes

1926 births
2016 deaths
People from Newark, New Jersey
Columbia University alumni
National War College alumni
University of California, Berkeley alumni
Ambassadors of the United States to Bulgaria
United States Foreign Service personnel